Julie Duncan (January 17, 1919 – June 20, 1986) was an American film actress who appeared in short subjects and Westerns. A native of Cornish, New Hampshire, she was a champion steeplechase rider.

Selected filmography

Texas Terrors (1940)
Wyoming Wildcat (1941)
 Desperate Cargo (1941)
 Fugitive Valley (1941)
 Overland Stagecoach (1942)
Texas Trouble Shooters (1942)
 Bullets and Saddles (1943)
Haunted Ranch (1943)
Cowboy in the Clouds (1943)
 Youth Aflame (1944)

Short subjects
 Three Smart Saps (1942) 
 Sappy Pappy (1942)
 They Stooge to Conga (1943)

References

External links

1919 births
1986 deaths
People from Cornish, New Hampshire
American film actresses
Western (genre) film actresses
20th-century American actresses